Oxygen-free may refer to the absence of oxygen in an environment or in a material. 

Not to be confused with free oxygen, oxygen in the atmosphere of Earth that is not combined with other elements and may be breathed by living beings.

Environmental conditions
 Hypoxia (environmental), an environment with low, or near-zero, oxygen content, commonly called anoxia;
 Anaerobic (disambiguation), a technical word which literally means without air (where "air" is generally used to mean oxygen), as opposed to aerobic;
 Aerobic (disambiguation), antonym of anaerobic

Oxygen-free materials
 Oxygen-free copper, pure copper without oxygen in its crystal lattice;
 OFHC, oxygen-free high thermal conductivity copper; 
 CuOFP, oxygen-free pure copper containing phosphorus